The 2000 Indiana Hoosiers football team represented Indiana University Bloomington during the 2000 NCAA Division I-A football season.  They participated as members of the Big Ten Conference. The Hoosiers played their home games at Memorial Stadium in Bloomington, Indiana. The team was coached by Cam Cameron in his fourth year as head coach.

Schedule

Roster

References

Indiana
Indiana Hoosiers football seasons
Indiana Hoosiers football